Elaine Ryan (1905-1981) was an American screenwriter and playwright known for writing Hollywood films in the 1930s and 1940s, as well as television in the 1950s.

Biography 
Elaine Ryan was born in San Francisco to Daniel Ryan (a prominent attorney) and Josephine Cooney (a teacher). She attended the University of California Berkeley and Yale University, where she was one of few female graduates of an esteemed playwriting program. She married William Wallace, a rancher, in 1931.

Selected filmography 

 Babes on Broadway (1941)
 A Very Young Lady (1941)
 Second Chorus (1940)
 Listen, Darling (1938)
 Mr. Dodd Takes the Air (1937)

References 

American women screenwriters
University of California, Berkeley alumni
Yale University alumni
1905 births
1981 deaths
20th-century American women writers
20th-century American screenwriters